Daphnia pulicaria is a species of freshwater crustaceans found within the genus of Daphnia, which are often called "water fleas," and they are commonly used as model organisms for scientific research Like other species of Daphnia, they reproduce via cyclic parthenogenesis. D. pulicaria are filter-feeders with a diet primarily consisting of algae, including Ankistrodesmus falcatus, and they can be found in deep lakes located in temperate climates. Furthermore, D. pulicaria are ecologically important herbivorous zooplankton, which help control algal populations and are a source of food for some fish. D. pulicaria are closely related to Daphnia pulex, and numerous studies have investigated the nature and strength of this relationship because these species can produce Daphnia pulex-pulicaria hybrids. In recent years, D. pulicaria along with other Daphnia species have been negatively affected by invasive predators, such as Bythotrephes longimanus.

Habitat and life history 
Daphnia pulicaria generally live in deep, permanent lakes. These lakes provide a more stable environment than temporary ponds, which eventually dry up, so populations of D. pulicaria tend to have lower mortality rates than D. pulex populations living in ponds. Furthermore, D. pulicaria have a relatively long lifespan of 60–65 days. The populations of D. pulicaria in the Great Lakes in the United States have been negatively affected by the invasive species Bythotrephes longimanus. This invasive predator of D. pulicaria has also contributed to a decline of other zooplankton species in the Great Lakes.

Reproduction 
Cyclic parthenogenesis is the primary mode of reproduction in D. pulicaria and other species within the genus Daphnia. Therefore, D. pulicaria are capable of switching between sexual and asexual reproduction based on environmental conditions. Typically, Daphnia undergo asexual reproduction when living in favorable conditions, such as in environments with abundant food or with negligible crowding. In contrast, they produce ephippia, which are dormant eggs, and reproduce sexually if environmental conditions worsen. Some studies suggest that populations of D. pulicaria in lakes in North America reproduce using the expected pattern of cyclic parthenogenesis while other populations in smaller ponds have shifted toward obligate parthenogenesis. The number of offspring produced through asexual reproduction is heavily influenced by the environmental conditions experienced by an individual. For instance, females in a high-food environment with a longer photoperiod tend to have more offspring. Environmental cues, such as food level, photoperiod, and temperature, significantly influence the reproduction of D. pulicaria.

Morphology 
Daphnia pulicaria have a translucent carapace and two prominent second antennae, which they use to move. The carapace, composed primarily of chitin, helps protect the feeding apparatus, and it is periodically shed during an individual's life. Daphnia have a compound eye, and they are known to have an optomotor response. D. pulicaria generally have a body length less than 3mm. Because of the clear carapace of Daphnia, it is possible to see the heart and digestive tract, which often appears to be green due to the consumption of algae. The abdominal claw is also visible toward the end of the abdomen, and it can be used to dislodge any algae from the feeding apparatus if some begins to stick.

Closely related species 
D. pulicaria are considered to be part of the Daphnia pulex species complex and can produce hybrids with D. pulex. While it is difficult to distinguish between these two species using morphological traits, D. pulicaria and D. pulex have significant genomic differences. Phylogenetic studies, using mitochondrial DNA analysis, have identified genetic divergence between D. pulicaria and D. pulex. For instance, variations in the Lactate dehydrogenase gene can help identify D. pulicaria from others in the D. pulex species complex.

Model organisms 
Species of Daphnia, including D. pulicaria, are commonly used as model organisms for studying life-history traits and phenotypic plasticity. For example, D. pulicaria can detect and respond to kairomones produced by predatory fish. Their sensitivity to environmental cues contributes to the observed seasonal trends in population sizes of D. pulicaria. Moreover, because D. pulicaria reproduce using cyclic parthenogenesis, they are ideal models for genetic studies, including ones concerning spontaneous mutations.

References

Crustaceans described in 1893
Freshwater crustaceans
Cladocera
Taxa named by Stephen Alfred Forbes